"State of the Nation" is a 1986 single by New Order. Like most songs by the group, it was composed by all of its members (Peter Hook, Gillian Gilbert, Stephen Morris and Bernard Sumner). However, unlike other New Order tracks, the title is included not just in the regular song lyrics but even in the chorus; as well, the lyrics are specific and direct in attacking "deprivation" and making social commentary rather than taking a more esoteric or metaphorical approach. The protest song has appeared in several releases by the group including in the popular singles compilation Substance.

Releases
The 12" version of the song is almost twice as long as the 7" version, and includes an additional verse.

The B-side was an alternate arrangement entitled "Shame of the Nation", which included, among other elements, backing vocals. This was written and produced with John Robie, marking the group's third collaboration with him.

The Australian 12" was the same as the UK 12", but the 7" version of the song was only released as the B-side of "Bizarre Love Triangle".

Though not included on most standard releases of the concurrently-released studio album Brotherhood, the 12" version of the song was included as a bonus track on some versions and was originally included on the US 12" version of "Bizarre Love Triangle". The 12" version of "Shame of the Nation" is included on the 2008 Collectors Edition of Low-Life.

Both sides of the 12" version were collected on the Substance compilation. The 7" version of "State of the Nation" was collected on the Singles compilation. The 7" version of "Shame of the Nation" can only be found on the original 7" vinyl release, and on the B-side of the Australian 7" of "Bizarre Love Triangle".

This song has a feature rare in a New Order single (or in much of the band's material in general): the song title not only appears in the narrative, but is also the chorus. Only a few New Order singles (e.g. "Shellshock", "Regret", "Crystal", "Confusion" and "Touched by the Hand of God") have titles consisting of words which are part of the song's lyrics.

Critical reception
Robin Smith of British music newspaper Record Mirror described it as a "colourless song, colourless tune, rather like the rest of their stuff."

Track listing

Chart positions

Notes:
1 - Charted together with "Bizarre Love Triangle".

References

1986 singles
1986 songs
Factory Records singles
Music videos directed by Big T.V.
New Order (band) songs
Songs written by Bernard Sumner
Songs written by Gillian Gilbert
Songs written by Peter Hook
Songs written by Stephen Morris (musician)
UK Independent Singles Chart number-one singles